Kan or KAN may refer to:

Places
 Kan (river), a tributary of the Yenisey in Russia
 Kan District of Iran
 Kan, Kyrgyzstan, a village in Batken Region
 Mallam Aminu Kano International Airport, Kano, Nigeria, IATA code
 Kannapolis (Amtrak station), North Carolina, US, station code
 Kansas, a U.S. state

People
 Kan (surname), including a list of people with the surname
 One of the Bacabs of Mayan mythology
 Kan (musician), Japanese singer-songwriter
 Kan Shimozawa (1892–1968), Japanese novelist
 Kan Otake (born 1983), Japanese professional baseball player

Music
 "Kan" (song), Israeli Eurovision song in 1991
 KAN, UK folk supergroup with Brian Finnegan and Aidan O'Rourke

In science and technology 
 kan, PDP ligand, kanamycin A
 Iwasawa decomposition  of a Lie group in mathematics

Weights and measures
 A Japanese unit of mass
 Kan, a Korean unit of length

Other uses  
 Dated transliteration of Gan in Chinese contexts
 Kan language (disambiguation), several languages
 Club of Committed Non-Party Members (KAN), Czech Republic
 Variation of the Sicilian Defence in chess
 Kan, the Israeli Broadcasting Corporation 
 A string of Japanese mon coins

See also
 Kann (disambiguation)
 Kaan (disambiguation)
 Kahn (German surname)
 Kane (disambiguation)
 Khan (disambiguation)
 Can (disambiguation)
 Kang (disambiguation)